James Cecil may refer to:

James Cecil, 3rd Earl of Salisbury (1648–1683)
James Cecil, 4th Earl of Salisbury (1666–1694) 
James Cecil, 5th Earl of Salisbury (1691–1728)
James Cecil, 6th Earl of Salisbury (1713–1780)
James Cecil, 1st Marquess of Salisbury (1748–1823)
James Cecil, 3rd Baron Rockley (1934–2011)

See also
James Gascoyne-Cecil (disambiguation)